was a Japanese artist who created airbrush art for magazines. His birth name was Yoshinori Sato. A selection of Sato's work is on display and for sale at the Pater Sato shop in Harajuku. Some examples of Pater Sato's work from past art auctions. Book of collected works

References

1945 births
1994 deaths
Japanese artists